Bassaka Air Limited  is a passenger airline in Cambodia, headquartered in Phnom Penh.

History
The airline was once called PP Air and changed its name to Bassaka Air. Bassaka Air also operated charter flights to China. An air operator certificate was officially awarded to Bassaka Air on 6 October 2014. It began domestic flights on 1 December 2014, and international flights shortly afterward on 1 May 2015, utilizing two Airbus A320 aircraft. Bassaka Air currently operates daily flights to Siem Reap and also flies internationally to Macau from Phnom Penh.

Destinations
Bassaka Air served the following destinations:

Fleet

The Bassaka Air fleet consists of the following aircraft (as of August 2019):

See also
 Transport in Cambodia
 List of airlines of Cambodia

References

External links

 Official website

Defunct airlines of Cambodia
Airlines established in 2014
Government-owned airlines
2018 disestablishments in Cambodia
Cambodian companies established in 2014